John Steeples (28 April 1959 – 20 March 2019) was an English former professional footballer who played as a forward. His death was announced on 21 March 2019.

References

1959 births
2019 deaths
Footballers from Doncaster
English footballers
Association football forwards
Pilkington Recreation F.C. players
Grimsby Town F.C. players
Torquay United F.C. players
Scarborough F.C. players
Grantham Town F.C. players
English Football League players